Unirea is a commune in Dolj County, Oltenia, Romania with a population of 4,620 people. It is composed of a single village, Unirea.

References

Communes in Dolj County
Localities in Oltenia